Patrick Kevin Ryan (born March 28, 1982) is an American businessman and Democratic politician serving as the U.S. representative for New York's 18th congressional district since 2023. He served as the representative for New York's 19th congressional district from 2022 to 2023, having been elected in a special election. He previously served as the county executive of Ulster County, New York.

Early life and career 
Ryan was born and raised in Kingston, New York, the son of Patricia L. and Kevin M. Ryan. He earned a Bachelor of Science in international politics from the United States Military Academy in 2004 and a Master of Arts in security studies from Georgetown University. Two of his West Point classmates are fellow Congressmen John James and Wesley Hunt. His wife is Rebecca Ryan (née Grusky). He was previously married and divorced.

Ryan served in the United States Army as a military intelligence officer from 2004 to 2009, including two tours in Iraq. From 2009 to 2011, he worked as the deputy director of Berico Technologies, as a subcontractor for Palantir Technologies in Afghanistan. He co-founded Praescient Analytics, a software company, in 2011. From 2015 to 2017, he was a senior vice president of Dataminr, an artificial intelligence platform. In 2018 and 2019, Ryan was a senior adviser at New Politics.

Ulster County executive (2019–2022) 
In February 2019, Ulster County Executive Mike Hein resigned to take a position in New York Governor Andrew Cuomo's administration. On April 30, Ryan defeated Republican nominee Jack Hayes in the special election to succeed Hein; he took office on June 7, 2019. He became the second executive of Ulster County since it adopted a county charter in 2008. In November 2019, he defeated Hayes in a rematch to win a full four-year term as county executive.

As county executive, Ryan piloted a universal basic income program, wherein 100 families in the county received $500 per month. He also enacted several environmental protections in Ulster County, committing to fully transition the operations of the county government to renewable energy by 2030 and partnering with SUNY Ulster to promote green energy jobs.

On January 14, 2020, Ryan endorsed Pete Buttigieg in the 2020 Democratic Party presidential primaries. In a statement, Ryan cited Buttigieg's military service, his "bold progressive vision", and his "moral leadership" as his reasons for support.

On September 9, 2022, Ryan stepped down as Ulster County Executive. The deputy county executive, Johanna Contreras, was sworn in as acting county executive that day.

U.S. House of Representatives (2022–present)

Elections

2018 

Ryan first ran for the U.S. House of Representatives in 2018. Delgado defeated incumbent Republican Representative John Faso in the general election.

2022 special 

After Delgado resigned from Congress on May 25, 2022, to become lieutenant governor of New York, Ryan announced that he would run in the special election to succeed Delgado. Ryan was chosen as the Democratic nominee on June 9 at a meeting of Democratic county party chairs.

In the August 23 special election, Ryan faced Republican nominee and Dutchess County Executive Marc Molinaro. Ryan was seen as the underdog as every poll had him trailing Molinaro and many believed that President Joe Biden's unpopularity would hinder Democrats in the swing district. Ryan narrowly defeated Molinaro by 2,858 votes, 51.1%–48.8%, which was considered an upset. He outperformed Biden's 2020 margin in the district by 0.8%. In explaining his victory, political observers noted that Ryan campaigned strongly in favor of protecting abortion rights in the wake of the U.S. Supreme Court ruling in Dobbs v. Jackson Women's Health Organization, which overturned Roe v. Wade. His victory was attributed to college-educated voters', particularly women's, support for abortion rights.

Molinaro and Ryan both ran for Congress again in the general elections in November 2022 for the newly redrawn 19th and 18th districts, respectively. Each won in his respective district.

2022 

In November 2022, Ryan contested the state's 18th district, which was changed from its previous configuration after redistricting. On the same day as his special election victory in the 19th district, Ryan won the Democratic nomination for the regular election in the 18th district. He defeated Republican nominee Colin Schmitt in the general election.

Tenure 
On February 1, 2023, Ryan was among twelve Democrats to vote for a resolution to end COVID-19 national emergency.

Committee assignments 
Committee on Armed Services
Committee on Transportation and Infrastructure

Caucus memberships
Congressional Equality Caucus
 New Democrat Coalition
 Pro-Choice Caucus

Electoral history

References

External links 

Congressman Pat Ryan official U.S. House website
Pat Ryan for Congress campaign website

|-

|-

1982 births
21st-century American businesspeople
21st-century American politicians
American technology company founders
Businesspeople from New York (state)
Candidates in the 2018 United States elections
County executives in New York (state)
Democratic Party members of the United States House of Representatives from New York (state)
Georgetown University alumni
Living people
Military personnel from New York (state)
People from Kingston, New York
Politicians from Kingston, New York
United States Army personnel of the Iraq War
United States Military Academy alumni
Walsh School of Foreign Service alumni